Gerzino Nyamsi (born 22 January 1997) is a French professional footballer who plays as a centre-back for Ligue 1 club Strasbourg.

Club career
Nyamsi is a youth exponent from Stade Rennais. He made his Ligue 1 debut on 10 September 2017 against Marseille. He played the full game.

On 30 August 2021, he signed a four-year contract with Strasbourg.

Personal life
Nyamsi was born in France and is of Cameroonian descent.

References

External links
 
 Profile at L'Équipe
 
 

1997 births
French sportspeople of Cameroonian descent
Sportspeople from Saint-Brieuc
Footballers from Brittany
Living people
Association football defenders
French footballers
Stade Rennais F.C. players
LB Châteauroux players
RC Strasbourg Alsace players
Ligue 1 players
Ligue 2 players
Championnat National 2 players
Championnat National 3 players